Alan Perry may refer to:

 Alan Perry (director), British director of many Gerry Anderson TV shows
 One half of the sculpting partnership Alan and Michael Perry
 A pseudonym for the composer Ernest Tomlinson